Notomeniidae is a family of solenogaster, a kind of shell-less, worm-like, marine mollusk.

Genera
 Notomenia Thiele, 1897

References

 García-Álvarez O. & Salvini-Plawen L.v. (2007). Species and diagnosis of the families and genera of Solenogastres (Mollusca). Iberus 25(2): 73-143

External links
  Salvini-Plawen, L. (2004). Contributions to the morphological diversity and classification of the order Cavibelonia (Mollusca: Solenogastres. Journal of Molluscan Studies. 70: 73-93

Solenogastres
Monogeneric mollusc families